Plantsbrook Local Nature Reserve is a nature reserve on the Plants Brook in The Royal Town of Sutton Coldfield, near Birmingham, England, consisting of open water, wetland, woodland and meadow. It is located on Eachelhurst Road, on the border of the Pype Hayes and Walmley districts. It was designated a Local Nature Reserve in 1991.

The reserve, managed by Birmingham City Council, measures  and is used as an educational resource.

References

External links
 Birmingham City Council page

Local Nature Reserves in the West Midlands (county)